The Sun Dance 36 is a French sailboat that was designed by Daniel Andrieu and J&J Design a cruiser and first built in 1988.

The design was developed into the Sun Odyssey 36 in 1990.

Production
The design was built by Jeanneau in France, from 1999 to 1990, but it is now out of production.

Design
The Sun Dance 36 is a recreational keelboat, built predominantly of fiberglass, with wood trim. It has a masthead sloop rig. The hull has a raked stem, a step-equipped reverse transom, an internally mounted spade-type rudder controlled by a wheel and a fixed fin keel or optional shoal draft keel. It displaces  and carries  of ballast.

The design has sleeping accommodation for six people, with a double "V"-berth in the bow cabin, an "U"-shaped settee around a rectangular table in the main cabin and an two aft cabins, each with a double berth. The galley is located on the port side, admidships and opposite the table. The galley is equipped with a three-burner stove, an ice box and a double sink. A navigation station is aft of the galley, on the port side. There are two heads, one each forward of each aft cabin, plus a sink in the bow cabin on the port side.

Operational history
A 1989 Cruising World review reported, "you'll have to see it to believe it. In the Sun Dance 36, Jeanneau has redefined that illusory point at which family cruiser stops and megayacht begins."

See also
List of sailing boat types

References

External links
Photo of a Sun Dance 36

Keelboats
1980s sailboat type designs
Sailing yachts
Sailboat type designs by Daniel Andrieu
Sailboat type designs by J&J Design
Sailboat types built by Jeanneau